"I'll Sleep When I'm Dead" is a song by American rock band Bon Jovi. It was released on July 26, 1993, as the fourth single from their fifth studio album, Keep the Faith (1992). The song was written by Jon Bon Jovi, Richie Sambora, and Desmond Child. "I'll Sleep When I'm Dead" reached  17 on the UK Singles Chart, No. 97 on the US Billboard Hot 100, and No. 29 on the Billboard Album Rock Tracks charts. The grave of the Doors' lead singer Jim Morrison was featured in the song's music video.

Live performances
The driving drumbeat and catchy chorus of "I'll Sleep When I'm Dead" have made it a crowd favourite during live performances. It had the distinction of being one of the few Bon Jovi songs to be played at virtually every live concert since its introduction, until The Circle Tour in 2010, where it was only played occasionally. When played, it is often incorporated into a medley with a cover song inserted into the middle, such as "Jumpin' Jack Flash" by The Rolling Stones, or "Papa Was a Rollin' Stone" by The Undisputed Truth.

Concert footage of "I'll Sleep When I'm Dead" can be viewed on the Live From London and The Crush Tour DVDs.

Track listings
US CD
 "I'll Sleep When I'm Dead" 4:44
 "I'll Sleep When I'm Dead (Live)"

UK CD
 "I'll Sleep When I'm Dead" 4:44
 "Blaze of Glory (Live)" 5:50 Recorded live at the Count Basie Theatre, Red Bank, New Jersey—December 1992
 "Wild in the Streets (Live)" 4:58 Recorded live at Tampa Sundome, Florida—March 1993

UK cassette single
 "I'll Sleep When I'm Dead" 4:44
 "Never Say Goodbye (Live Acoustic Version)" 5:30 Recorded live at the Miami Arena, Florida—March 1993

Personnel
 Jon Bon Jovi – lead vocals
 Richie Sambora – guitars
 Alec John Such – bass guitar
 Tico Torres – drums
 David Bryan – keyboards
 Bob Rock – producer ("I'll Sleep When I'm Dead")
 Obie O'Brien – producer/engineer ("Blaze of Glory (Live)", "Wild In The Streets (Live)", "Never Say Goodbye (Live Acoustic Version)"), mix ("Wild In The Streets (Live)", "Never Say Goodbye (Live Acoustic Version)")
 Nicoloa – mix ("Wild In The Streets (Live)")
 Margery Greenspan – art direction
 Patricia Lie – design
 Frank Ockenfels – photography

Charts

References

Bon Jovi songs
1993 singles
Songs written by Desmond Child
Songs written by Richie Sambora
Songs written by Jon Bon Jovi
Song recordings produced by Bob Rock
1992 songs
Mercury Records singles
Cultural depictions of Jim Morrison